John Englander is an American author, oceanographer, scuba diver and climate consultant. He was the CEO of the Cousteau Society beginning in 1997 after meeting Jacques Cousteau until Cousteau's death.

Books
Moving to Higher Ground: Rising Sea Level and the Path Forward (Science Bookshelf, 2021) 
High Tide on Main Street: Rising Sea Level and the Coming Coastal Crisis (Science Bookshelf, 2012)

References

External links
Official site

 

American oceanographers
American writers
Living people
Year of birth missing (living people)